Alias a Gentleman is a 1948 American romantic comedy film directed by Harry Beaumont and starring Wallace Beery.  The supporting cast includes Dorothy Patrick, Tom Drake, Gladys George and Sheldon Leonard.

Plot
Jim Breedin has been in prison for 15 years but his daughter Nora doesn't know it. He has had no contact with her since she was a child. On an honor farm where he is foreman, Jim meets new convict Johnny Lorgen, who mouths off until Jim sets him straight. They become friendly and talk about their futures.

About to get out, Jim is offered $250,000 for his Oklahoma farm by an oil company. Nora, who had been living on the farm, is not there, Jim unaware that she has died. He accepts the money and begins living a life of luxury. A mob boss, Matt Enley, tries to persuade Jim to come work for him, without success. A diabolical plot is hatched, Enley's attractive moll Elaine Carter pretending to be Jim's long-lost daughter.

Johnny's jail sentence is up. Jim wants him to go straight, but working for Enley appeals to Johnny more. He also develops a crush on Elaine, whose guilty conscience makes her confess the ruse she's been pulling. Enley comes after Jim, who prevails, then invites Elaine to become his adopted daughter.

Cast
 Wallace Beery as Jim Breedin
 Tom Drake as Johnny Lorgen
 Dorothy Patrick as Elaine Carter
 Gladys George as Madge Parkson
 Leon Ames as Matt Enley
 Warner Anderson as Capt. Charlie Lopen
 John Qualen as No End
 Sheldon Leonard as Harry Bealer
 DaLonne (Dee) David as Hat Check Girl

Reception
The film earned $1,013,000 in the US and Canada and $353,000 elsewhere resulting in a loss of $262,000.

References

External links 
 

1948 films
American black-and-white films
Films directed by Harry Beaumont
Metro-Goldwyn-Mayer films
1948 romantic comedy films
American romantic comedy films
1940s English-language films
1940s American films